is a Jōdo-shū Buddhist temple located in the Hidaka-chō neighborhood of the city of Toyooka, Hyōgo, Japan. Its main image is a statue of Yakushi Nyorai. It is the modern successor of one of the provincial temples established by Emperor Shōmu during the Nara period (710–794) for the purpose of promoting Buddhism as the national religion of Japan and standardising control of Yamato rule over the provinces. The foundation stones for the original temple were designated as a National Historic Site in 1990, with the area under protection extended in 2000, 2004, 2011, 2013 and 2015.

History

The Tajima Kokubun-ji is located in the Kokufu Plain formed by the Maruyama River in the southern part of Toyooka City. The current precincts overlap with the ruins of ancient provincial temple, and the ruins of Kokubun-niji provincial nunnery are located about one kilometer to the north. In addition, the Narafugamori site, which is presumed to be the remains of the provincial capital after the Heian period, is also located in the vicinity (the location of the capital before the Heian period is unknown). 

The precise date of the construction of the Tajima Kokubun-ji has not been confirmed from archaeological materials or literature, however, it is mentioned in an entry in the "Shoku Nihongi" dated 756, so it must have been built soon after Emperor Shōmu's proclamation of 741. Archaeologically, dendrochronology on wood found in a well on the site yielded a date of 763, and a wooden tablet found at the site estimated to date from 767 to 770 lists some of the temple's organization, staffing and structures, including a pagoda, which another wooden tablet lists as having been damaged by a lightning strike in 777. The temple is listed in the Engishiki records of 927 as having a revenue of 20,000 bundles of rice. As with most of the kokubun-ji around the country, the temple fell into decline with the collapse of central government authority at the end of the Heian period, and its subsequent history becomes confused. Per a document dated 1285, it appears that the temple had become a shōen landed estate controlled by the "Hossoji clan", which received tax exemption from Northern Court Emperor Kōgon in 1338. It was the site of number of battles during the Nanboku-chō period and was often referred to as "Kokubunji Castle", although a temple also remained on the site, as other documents indicate that it became a subsidiary of Saidai-ji in Nara in 1381. In 1580, Toyotomi Hidenaga defeated Otsubo Matashiro during his conquest of Tajima Province, and the temple burned down during that struggle. It appears that the site remained in ruins until the temple was revived in 1759. In 1814, Ino Tadataka surveyed the area, leaving a record of the location of the temple's remains and that of the provincial nunnery.

The site of the ancient temple was first  excavated in 1973, and excavations continued 34 times through 2016. The temple occupied and area 160 meters square, and consisted of a South Gate, Central Gate, Kondō and Kōdō (Lecture Hall) in a straight line from south to north. A cloister extended from the sides of the Middle Gate to the Main Hall, and the Pagoda was located 50 meters to the west of the Main Hall. Judging from the size and layout of the foundation, the pagoda was a seven-story structure. In the southeast corner of the compound, the remains of an enclosing wall and moat have been found. Per the standardized "Shichidō garan" layout of buildings, similar to Tōdai-ji in Nara, upon which the kokubunji temples were based, other structures such as a sutra library and bell tower should have existed, but these foundations have not been found, and not all of the foundation stones served by Ino Tadataka in 1814 remain in situ. On the other hand, the foundations of a large building with a corridor (more than 70 meters north-south) has been found to the east of the Main Hall. This is the first example of a building other than a Main Hall with a corridor found at any kokubunji site, and the function of the building remains uncertain.

See also
List of Historic Sites of Japan (Hyōgo)
provincial temple

References

External links

 Toyooka City home page

Historic Sites of Japan
Toyooka, Hyōgo
Tajima Province
8th-century establishments in Japan
8th-century Buddhist temples
Nara period
Buddhist archaeological sites in Japan
Pure Land temples